Viktor (or Viktar) Ginko (born 7 December 1965 in Sharkovshchina, Vitebsk) is a male race walker from Belarus.

Achievements

External links

1965 births
Living people
Belarusian male racewalkers
Athletes (track and field) at the 1996 Summer Olympics
Athletes (track and field) at the 2000 Summer Olympics
Olympic athletes of Belarus
Sportspeople from Vitebsk Region